Bocca is an Italian surname meaning mouth. Notable people with this surname include:

 Geoffrey Bocca (1924-1983), English novelist and historian
 Giorgio Bocca (1920–2011), Italian essayist and journalist
 Julio Bocca, Argentinian ballet dancer
 Pietro Bocca (died 1487), Italian bishop
 Valentino Bocca, boy whose case went to court over the MMR vaccine and autism scandal

See also